Cyrus William Beales (December 16, 1877 – November 14, 1927) was a Republican member of the U.S. House of Representatives from Pennsylvania.

C. William Beales was born on a farm near York Spring, Pennsylvania. At the age of thirteen, upon the death of his father, took over the operation of his father’s farm. He graduated from the pharmaceutical department of the Ohio Northern University at Ada, Ohio, in 1899. He settled at York Springs and was employed as a pharmacist. He moved to Gettysburg, Pennsylvania, in 1903 upon his appointment as mercantile appraiser of Adams County. He was clerk to the county commissioners in 1904 and 1905, and was engaged in the drug, banking, manufacturing, and printing businesses. He was the postmaster of Gettysburg from 1910 to 1914.

Beales was elected as a Republican to the Sixty-fourth Congress. He was not a candidate for renomination in 1916. He was a member of the Pennsylvania State Senate from 1917 to 1921. He remained engaged in the drug business in Gettysburg until his death in 1927. He is interred in his family plot in Evergreen Cemetery.

Sources

The Political Graveyard

External links
 

1877 births
1927 deaths
Burials at Evergreen Cemetery (Adams County, Pennsylvania)
County clerks in Pennsylvania
Ohio Northern University alumni
Republican Party Pennsylvania state senators
Republican Party members of the United States House of Representatives from Pennsylvania

Politicians from Gettysburg, Pennsylvania